is a Japanese politician of the Liberal Democratic Party, a member of the House of Representatives in the Diet (national legislature). A native of Kumamoto, Kumamoto and graduate of Waseda University, he was elected for the first time in 2005 after working at Japan Airlines until 2004.
The end of September 2013 he was appointed Parliamentary Secretary of Defense (防卫 大臣 政务 官).

References

External links 
  in Japanese.

1969 births
Living people
People from Kumamoto
Waseda University alumni
Japan Airlines
Koizumi Children
Members of the House of Representatives (Japan)
Liberal Democratic Party (Japan) politicians
Members of Nippon Kaigi